Marta Mascarello (born 15 October 1998) is an Italian footballer who plays as a midfielder for Milan, on loan from Fiorentina, and the Italy women's national team.

Career
She made her debut for the Italy national team on 4 March 2020 in the Algarve Cup against Portugal, coming on as a substitute.

Personal life
Mascarello is originally from Bra and, as of 2019, resides in Monticello d'Alba.

References

1998 births
Living people
Women's association football midfielders
Italian women's footballers
Italy women's international footballers
U.P.C. Tavagnacco players
Fiorentina Women's F.C. players
People from Bra, Piedmont
Footballers from Piedmont
Sportspeople from the Province of Cuneo
21st-century Italian women